Gemmula sculpturata is an extinct species of sea snail, a marine gastropod mollusk in the family Turridae, the turrids.

Description

Distribution
Fossils of this marine species have been found in Miocene strata in Northern Borneo

References

 Harzhauser M., Raven H., Landau B.M., Kocsis L., Adnan A., Zuschin M., Mandic O. & Briguglio A. (2018). Late Miocene gastropods from northern Borneo (Brunei Darussalam, Seria Formation). Palaeontographica, Abt. A: Palaeozoology – Stratigraphy. 313(1-3): 1-79

sculpturata
Gastropods described in 2018